Lê Tấn Tài (born 4 January 1984) is a Vietnamese former footballer, and former captain of the Vietnam national football team, where he plays as a central midfielder. He last played for Khánh Hòa in the V.League 2.

International career
Tan Tai, along with other Vietnam national team members, attended Vietnam's first AFC Asian Cup in 2007 that was hosted in Vietnam, Thailand, Indonesia, and Malaysia. In 2008, he helped Vietnam win their first ever AFF Championship trophy.

Since Henrique Calisto comes in charge of the national team, Tai is moved to play in the more central role in the midfield. He plays as the highest midfielder in Calisto's one-striker system.

After the 2014 AFF Championship, Tan Tai announced his retirement from international football.

International goals
Scores and results list Vietnam's goal tally first.

Under-23

Vietnam

Honours

Club
Khatoco Khánh Hòa
V.League 2: 2005
Vietnamese Second Division: 2004
Becamex Bình Dương
V.League 1:2014, 2015
Vietnamese National Cup: 2015, 2018
Vietnamese Super Cup: 2014, 2015
Hanoi FC
Vietnamese National Cup: 2020
Vietnamese Super Cup: 2020

International
Vietnam U23
 Silver Medal SEA Games: 2005

Vietnam
 ASEAN Football Championship: 2008

Individuals
  Vietnamese Silver Ball : 2012
 Vietnamese Bronze Ball: 2005, 2006
  Young Player of the Year : 2005

References

External links 

1984 births
Living people
People from Khánh Hòa Province
2007 AFC Asian Cup players
Vietnam international footballers
Vietnamese footballers
Becamex Binh Duong FC players
V.League 1 players
Association football midfielders
Footballers at the 2006 Asian Games
Southeast Asian Games medalists in football
Southeast Asian Games silver medalists for Vietnam
Competitors at the 2005 Southeast Asian Games
Asian Games competitors for Vietnam